This is a list of law enforcement agencies in the state of New Hampshire.

According to the US Bureau of Justice Statistics' 2008 Census of State and Local Law Enforcement Agencies, the state had 208 law enforcement agencies employing 2,936 sworn police officers, about 222 for each 100,000 residents.

State agencies 
 New Hampshire Administrative Office of Courts, Security Department
 New Hampshire Liquor Commission
 Division of Enforcement 
 New Hampshire Department of Corrections
 New Hampshire Department of Safety
Division of Fire Safety (Office of State Fire Marshal)
Division of State Police
 Field Operations Bureau
 New Hampshire Marine Patrol
 State Office Complex Police
 New Hampshire Fish and Game Department
 Law Enforcement Division
 New Hampshire Office of the Attorney General
 Criminal Justice Bureau
 New Hampshire Department of Natural and Cultural Resources
 Division of Forests and Lands
 Forest Protection Bureau

County agencies 

 Belknap County Sheriff's Office 
 Carroll County Sheriff's Office 
 Cheshire County Sheriff's Department 
 Coös County Sheriff's Office 
 Grafton County Sheriff's Office 
 Hillsborough County Sheriff's Office 
 Merrimack County Sheriff's Office
 Rockingham County Sheriff's Office 
 Strafford County Sheriff's Office 
 Sullivan County Sheriff's Office

Municipal agencies 

Alexandria Police Department
Allenstown Police Department
Alstead Police Department
Alton Police Department
Amherst Police Department
Andover Police Department
Antrim Police Department
Ashland Police Department
Atkinson Police Department
Auburn Police Department
Barnstead Police Department
Barrington Police Department
Bartlett Police Department
Bedford Police Department
Belmont Police Department
Bennington Department
Berlin Police Department
Bethlehem Police Department
Boscawen Police Department
Bow Police Department
Bradford Police Department
Brentwood Police Department
Bridgewater Police Department
Bristol Police Department
Brookline Police Department
Campton Police Department
Canaan Police Department
Candia Police Department
Canterbury Police Department
Carroll Police Department
Center Harbor Police Department
Charlestown Police Department
Chester Police Department
Chesterfield Police Department
Chichester Police Department
Claremont Police Department
Colebrook Police Department
Concord Police Department
Conway Police Department
Cornish Police Department
Danbury Police Department
Danville Police Department
Deerfield Police Department
Deering Police Department
Derry Police Department
Dover Police Department
Dublin Police Department
Dunbarton Police Department
Durham Police Department
East Kingston Police Department
Effingham Police Department
Enfield Police Department
Epping Police Department
Epsom Police Department
Exeter Police Department
Farmington Police Department
Fitzwilliam Police Department
Francestown Police Department
Franconia Police Department
Franklin Police Department
Freedom Police Department
Fremont Police Department
Gilmanton Police Department
Gilford Police Department
Goffstown Police Department
Gorham Police Department
Goshen Police Department
Grafton Police Department
Grantham Police Department
Greenland Police Department
Groton Police Department
Hampstead Police Department
Hampton Police Department
Hampton Falls Police Department
Hancock Police Department
Hanover Police Department
Harrisville Police Department
Haverhill Police Department
Hebron Police Department
Henniker Police Department
Hill Police Department
Hillsborough Police Department
Hinsdale Police Department
Holderness Police Department
Hollis Police Department
Hooksett Police Department
Hopkinton Police Department
Hudson Police Department
Jackson Police Department
Jaffrey Police Department
Keene Police Department
Kensington Police Department
Kingston Police Department
Laconia Police Department
Lancaster Police Department
Langdon Police Department
Lebanon Police Department
Lee Police Department
Lincoln Police Department
Lisbon Police Department
Litchfield Police Department
Littleton Police Department
Londonderry Police Department
Loudon Police Department
Lyme Police Department
Lyndeborough Police Department
Madbury Police Department
Madison Police Department
Manchester Police Department
Marlborough Police Department
Marlow Police Department
Mason Police Department
Meredith Police Department
Merrimack Police Department
Middleton Police Department
Milford Police Department
Milton Police Department
Mont Vernon Police Department
Moultonborough Police Department
Nashua Police Department
Nelson Police Department
New Boston Police Department
New Castle Police Department
New Durham Police Department
New Hampton Police Department
New Ipswich Police Department
New London Police Department
Newbury Police Department
Newfields Police Department
Newington Police Department
Newmarket Police Department
Newport Police Department
Newton Police Department
North Hampton Police Department
Northfield Police Department
Northumberland Police Department
Northwood Police Department
Nottingham Police Department
Orford Police Department
Ossipee Police Department
Pelham Police Department
Pembroke Police Department
Peterborough Police Department
Piermont Police Department
Pittsburg Police Department
Pittsfield Police Department
Plaistow Police Department
Plainfield Police Department
Plymouth Police Department
Portsmouth Police Department
Randolph Police Department
Raymond Police Department
Rindge Police Department
Rochester Police Department
Rollinsford Police Department
Roxbury Police Department
Rumney Police Department
Rye Police Department
Salem Police Department
Sanborton Police Department
Sandown Police Department
Sandwich Police Department
Seabrook Police Department
Somersworth Police Department
South Hampton Police Department
Springfield Police Department
Stoddard Police Department
Strafford Police Department
Stratham Police Department
Sugar Hill Police Department
Sunapee Police Department
Sutton Police Department
Swanzey Police Department
Tamworth Police Department
Temple-Greenville Police Department (Towns of Greenville and Temple)
Thornton Police Department
Tilton Police Department
Troy Police Department
Tuftonboro Police Department
Wakefield Police Department
Walpole Police Department
Warner Police Department
Warren Police Department
Washington Police Department
Waterville Valley Police Department
Weare Police Department
Webster Police Department
Wentworth Police Department
Whitefield Police Department
Wilton Police Department
Winchester Police Department
Windham Police Department
Wolfeboro Police Department
Woodstock Police Department

College and university agencies 
Plymouth State University Police Department
University of New Hampshire Police Department

Disbanded agencies 
Croydon Police Department
Richmond Police Department
Surry Police Department
Unity Police Department

Notes 
1. As of 12/31/2021, Hill Police Department lost its only officer, and has hired a consultant to determine the agency's future. The agency is attempting to hire a P/T police chief as of 6/7/2022.

References

New Hampshire
Law enforcement agencies of New Hampshire
Law enforcement agencies